The Archostemata are the smallest suborder of beetles, consisting 45 living species in five families. They are an ancient lineage with a number of primitive characteristics. Antennae may be thread-shaped (filiform) or like a string of beads (moniliform). This suborder also contains the only beetles where both sexes are paedogenic, Micromalthus debilis. Modern archostematan beetles are considered rare, but were more diverse during the Mesozoic. The term "Archostemata" is used more broadly by some authors to include both modern archostematans as well as stem-group beetles like "protocoleopterans", which some modern archostematans closely resemble to due to their plesiomorphic morphology. Genetic research suggests that modern archostematans are a monophyletic group. Some genetic studies have recovered archostematans as the sister group of Myxophaga.

Taxonomy
There are five extant families.
 Family Crowsoniellidae Iablokoff-Khnzorian, 1983
 Family Cupedidae Laporte, 1838
 Family Micromalthidae Barber, 1913
 Family Ommatidae Sharp and Muir, 1912
 Family Jurodidae Ponomarenko, 1985

See also 
 List of subgroups of the order Coleoptera

References

External links 

 Tree of Life - Archostemata

 
Insect suborders
Extant Permian first appearances
Taxa named by Hermann Julius Kolbe